SM UC-15 was a German Type UC I minelayer submarine or U-boat in the German Imperial Navy during World War I. The U-boat was ordered on 23 November 1914, laid down on 28 January 1915, and was launched on 19 May 1915. She was commissioned into the German Imperial Navy on 28 June 1915 as SM UC-15. Mines laid by UC-15 during her eight patrols are credited with sinking 3 ships. UC-15 disappeared in November 1916.

Design
A German Type UC I submarine, UC-15 had a displacement of  when at the surface and  while submerged. The submarine was powered by one Benz six-cylinder, four-stroke diesel engine producing , an electric motor producing , and one propeller shaft.

UC-15 was fitted with six  mine tubes, twelve UC 120 mines, and one  machine gun. She was built by AG Weser Bremen and her complement was fourteen crew members.

Loss
After completion, UC-15 joined the Constantinople Flotilla and became the Flotilla's only minelaying submarine in November 1915, after her sister ship UC-13 was accidentally grounded and subsequently destroyed by her crew. In November 1916, UC-15 was sent on a minelaying mission off the Romanian port of Sulina and never returned, being sunk by her own mines. This was probably caused by an encounter with the Romanian torpedo boat Smeul, whose captain surprised a German submarine near Sulina in November 1916, the latter reportedly never returning to her base at Varna. This could only be UC-15, whose systems most likely malfunctioned after being forced to submerge in the shallow waters, upon encountering the Romanian torpedo boat.

Summary of raiding history

References

Notes

Citations

Bibliography

 
 

German Type UC I submarines
U-boats commissioned in 1915
World War I submarines of Germany
Maritime incidents in 1916
U-boats sunk in 1916
1915 ships
World War I minelayers of Germany
Ships built in Bremen (state)
World War I shipwrecks in the Black Sea